Davis Taylor Walls (born July 10, 1996) is an American professional baseball shortstop for the Tampa Bay Rays of Major League Baseball (MLB). He made his MLB debut in 2021.

Amateur career
Walls attended Crisp County High School in Cordele, Georgia, where he played baseball. In 2014, his senior year, he batted over .400 while pitching to a 0.70 earned run average (ERA). Undrafted in the 2014 Major League Baseball draft, Walls enrolled at Florida State University (FSU), where he played college baseball for the Florida State Seminoles.

In 2015, during Walls' freshman year at Florida State, he earned a starting spot, and started all 65 of FSU's games, batting .220 with 22 runs batted in (RBIs) and seven stolen bases. As a sophomore in 2016, Walls slashed .355/.479/.516 with six home runs, 46 RBIs, and 14 stolen bases over 63 starts, earning All-ACC Second Team honors. In 2017, his junior season, Walls started 68 of FSU's 69 games, hitting .273 with eight home runs and 47 RBIs. After the season, Walls was selected by the Tampa Bay Rays in the third round of the 2017 Major League Baseball draft.

Professional career
Walls signed with the Rays and made his professional debut with the Hudson Valley Renegades of the Class A Short Season New York–Penn League, batting .213 with one home run over 46 games. In 2018, Walls played with the Bowling Green Hot Rods of the Class A Midwest League (with whom he earned All-Star honors), slashing .304/.393/.428 with six home runs, 57 RBIs, and 31 stolen bases over 120 games. Walls started the 2019 season with the Charlotte Stone Crabs of the Class A-Advanced Florida State League, being named an All-Star. He missed three weeks during the season due to a quadriceps injury. In June, he was promoted to the Montgomery Biscuits of the Class AA Southern League, with whom he finished the season. Over 96 games between the two clubs, Walls batted .270/.343/.452 with ten home runs, 46 RBIs, and 28 stolen bases.

Walls did not play a minor league game in 2020 due to the cancellation of the minor league season caused by the COVID-19 pandemic. On November 20, 2020, he was added to the 40-man roster. To begin the 2021 season, he was assigned to the Durham Bulls of the Triple-A East.

On May 22, 2021, Walls was promoted to the major leagues for the first time. He made his debut that day and recorded his first MLB hit, a double off of Toronto Blue Jays starter Robbie Ray, during the game. Walls ended the 2021 season with Tampa Bay slashing .211/.314/.296 with one home run, 15 RBIs, and ten doubles over 152 at-bats.

Personal life
Walls and his wife, Hallie, gave birth to a daughter in April 2021.

References

External links

Florida State Seminoles bio

1996 births
Living people
People from Cordele, Georgia
Baseball players from Georgia (U.S. state)
Major League Baseball infielders
Tampa Bay Rays players
Florida State Seminoles baseball players
Hudson Valley Renegades players
Bowling Green Hot Rods players
Charlotte Stone Crabs players
Montgomery Biscuits players
Durham Bulls players
Anchorage Bucs players